Schraderia mardeni is a species of amphipod in the family Pontogeneiidae. It was originally described as Dolobrotus mardeni, and was the only species in the genus Dolobrotus, but that genus is now considered a synonym of Schraderia. Discovered by Luis Marden, after whom it is named, Schraderia mardeni is a deep-water Atlantic lobster-bait scavenger or parasite.

References

Crustaceans of the Atlantic Ocean
Gammaridea
Crustaceans described in 1974